The Hua Hin Championships (also known as the WTA Thailand Open) is a women's tennis tournament on the WTA Tour played on outdoor hardcourts in Hua Hin, Thailand. It is currently held in February, following the Australian Open.

History
On debut in 2019, the event was sponsored by Toyota and was also known as the Toyota Thailand Open. Initially, the event was classified as a WTA International tournament, but has been a WTA 250 tournament as of the 2023 edition; the first to be played since the rebranding of WTA tournament categories in 2020. The tournament did not take place in 2021 and 2022 due to COVID-19 pandemic.

A low-level men's and women's Challenger Tour event was previously held in the same location in 2015 and 2017 in November.

Past finals

Singles

Doubles

External links
 WTA tournament profile

References

Hua Hin Championships
2019 establishments in Thailand
Tennis
WTA Tour
Hard court tennis tournaments
February sporting events
Recurring sporting events established in 2019
Tennis
Tennis tournaments in Thailand